Lee Su-jin (born 1977) is a South Korean film director and screenwriter. His first feature was the award-winning Han Gong-ju (2014).

Career
Lee Su-jin was born in Gimcheon in 1977. He began his filmmaking career directing short films, notably Papa (2004) which received a Korean Film Archive Award at the 30th Seoul Independent Film Festival, and Enemy's Apple (2007) which won Best Film in the A City of Sadness section of the 7th Mise-en-scène Short Film Festival.

Lee made his feature film directorial debut with Han Gong-ju, which he also wrote and produced. It premiered at the 18th Busan International Film Festival in 2013, where it received the CGV Movie Collage Award and the Citizen Reviewer's Award. Based on the infamous Miryang gang rape case in 2004, the film follows a traumatized, withdrawn teenage girl who is forced to change schools and move to a remote city after a horrific incident, who then attempts to rebuild her life and connect with others through music. Despite the subject, Lee said he "decided to focus more on the life of the victim after the crime rather than the crime itself" and that he "wanted to make a film about how a girl struggles to not let go of her hope" in order "to give courage to all the Han Gong-jus in the world who find themselves in the same situation." He said he cast breakout star Chun Woo-hee in the title role because he was struck by her sensitivity and intelligence, and "that she has a face that makes her look familiar." Han Gong-ju went on to more acclaim in the international film festival circuit, winning top prizes such as the Golden Star (Étoile d'or) at the 13th Marrakech International Film Festival, the Tiger Award at the 43rd International Film Festival Rotterdam, the Grand Prize (Regard d'or) at the 28th Fribourg International Film Festival, as well as the Jury Prize, Critics' Prize and Audience Award at the 16th Deauville Asian Film Festival. In 2014, Han Gong-ju was released on 226 screens in South Korea and drew 225,580 admissions, making it one of the most commercially successful Korean low-budget independent films. It received multiple domestic awards, including Best Film at the 6th KOFRA Film Awards and Grand Prize at the 2nd Wildflower Film Awards. Lee also won Best Independent Film Director at the 14th Director's Cut Awards, Best Screenplay at the 34th Korean Association of Film Critics Awards and Best New Director at the 35th Blue Dragon Film Awards.

Filmography 
I Go I (short film, 2002) - director, screenwriter
Lipstick (short film, 2003) - director, screenwriter
Papa (short film, 2004) - director, screenwriter, cinematographer, editor
Son's (short film, 2006) - director, screenwriter
Sundays in August (2006) - assistant director, extra
Enemy's Apple (short film, 2007) - director, screenwriter
Happiness (2007) - directing department
Han Gong-ju (2014) - director, screenwriter, producer
Idol (2019) - director, screenwriter

Awards 
2015 16th Jeonju International Film Festival: Moet&Chandon Rising Star Award (Han Gong-ju)
2014 14th Director's Cut Awards: Best Independent Film Director (Han Gong-ju)
2014 34th Korean Association of Film Critics Awards: Best Screenplay (Han Gong-ju)
2014 35th Blue Dragon Film Awards: Best New Director (Han Gong-ju)

References

External links 
 
 
 

1977 births
Living people
People from Gimcheon
South Korean film directors
South Korean screenwriters